Mountain Meadow Preserve is a  open space preserve located in the Berkshires and Green Mountains of northwest Massachusetts and adjacent Vermont in the towns of Williamstown and Pownal.

Located on Mason Hill (a sub-peak of The Dome), the preserve is open to hiking, cross-country skiing, and similar passive pursuits. Views from the property include Mount Greylock and the Taconic Mountains to the west. Trailheads are located on Mason Road in Williamstown and White Oaks Road in Pownal.

History

Mountain Meadow Preserve was given to the Trustees of Reservations in 1998 by Pamela B. Weatherbee. Additional lands were purchased in 2000.

References

External links
Mountain Meadow Preserve The Trustees of Reservations
Trail map

Protected areas of Berkshire County, Massachusetts
The Trustees of Reservations
Open space reserves of Massachusetts
Protected areas of Bennington County, Vermont
Nature reserves in Vermont
Protected areas established in 1998
1998 establishments in Massachusetts
1998 establishments in Vermont